The 66th Street–Lincoln Center station is a local station on the IRT Broadway–Seventh Avenue Line of the New York City Subway. Located at the intersection of 66th Street and Broadway in Lincoln Square, Manhattan, it is served by the 1 train at all times and by the 2 train during late nights.

The 66th Street station was constructed for the Interborough Rapid Transit Company (IRT) as part of the city's first subway line, which was approved in 1900. Construction of the line segment that includes the 66th Street station began on August 22 of the same year. The station opened on October 27, 1904, as one of the original 28 stations of the New York City Subway. The station's platforms have been lengthened since opening.

The 66th Street station contains two side platforms and four tracks; express trains use the inner two tracks to bypass the station. The station was built with tile and mosaic decorations. The platforms contain exits to 66th Street and Broadway as well as to Lincoln Center. The station contains elevators from the street, which make it compliant with the Americans with Disabilities Act of 1990.

History

Construction and opening 

Planning for a subway line in New York City dates to 1864. However, development of what would become the city's first subway line did not start until 1894, when the New York State Legislature authorized the Rapid Transit Act. The subway plans were drawn up by a team of engineers led by William Barclay Parsons, chief engineer of the Rapid Transit Commission. It called for a subway line from New York City Hall in lower Manhattan to the Upper West Side, where two branches would lead north into the Bronx. A plan was formally adopted in 1897, and all legal conflicts concerning the route alignment were resolved near the end of 1899.

The Rapid Transit Construction Company, organized by John B. McDonald and funded by August Belmont Jr., signed the initial Contract 1 with the Rapid Transit Commission in February 1900, under which it would construct the subway and maintain a 50-year operating lease from the opening of the line. In 1901, the firm of Heins & LaFarge was hired to design the underground stations. Belmont incorporated the Interborough Rapid Transit Company (IRT) in April 1902 to operate the subway.

The 66th Street station was constructed as part of the IRT's West Side Line (now the Broadway–Seventh Avenue Line) from 60th Street to 82nd Street, for which work had begun on August 22, 1900. Work for that section had been awarded to William Bradley. By late 1903, the subway was nearly complete, but the IRT Powerhouse and the system's electrical substations were still under construction, delaying the system's opening. The 66th Street station opened on October 27, 1904, as one of the original 28 stations of the New York City Subway from City Hall to 145th Street on the West Side Branch.

Service changes and station renovations

1910s to 1930s
After the first subway line was completed in 1908, the station was served by local trains along both the West Side (now the Broadway–Seventh Avenue Line to Van Cortlandt Park–242nd Street) and East Side (now the Lenox Avenue Line). West Side local trains had their southern terminus at City Hall during rush hours and South Ferry at other times, and had their northern terminus at 242nd Street. East Side local trains ran from City Hall to Lenox Avenue (145th Street).

To address overcrowding, in 1909, the New York Public Service Commission proposed lengthening platforms at stations along the original IRT subway. As part of a modification to the IRT's construction contracts, made on January 18, 1910, the company was to lengthen station platforms to accommodate ten-car express and six-car local trains. In addition to $1.5 million (equivalent to $ million in ) spent on platform lengthening, $500,000 was spent on building additional entrances and exits. It was anticipated that these improvements would increase capacity by 25 percent. Both platforms were extended to the north and south. Six-car local trains began operating in October 1910. The Broadway–Seventh Avenue Line opened south of Times Square–42nd Street in 1918, thereby dividing the original line into an "H"-shaped system. The original subway north of Times Square thus became part of the Broadway–Seventh Avenue Line, and all local trains were sent to South Ferry.

In December 1922, the Transit Commission approved a $3 million project to lengthen platforms at 14 local stations along the original IRT line, including 66th Street and five other stations on the Broadway–Seventh Avenue Line. The commission postponed the platform-lengthening project in September 1923, at which point the cost had risen to $5.6 million.

1940s to 1970s
The city government took over the IRT's operations on June 12, 1940. The IRT routes were given numbered designations in 1948 with the introduction of "R-type" rolling stock, which contained rollsigns with numbered designations for each service.  The Broadway route to 242nd Street became known as the 1 and the Lenox Avenue route as the 3.

The original IRT stations north of Times Square could barely fit local trains of five or six cars depending on the configuration of the trains. Stations on the line from 50th Street to 96th Street, including this station but excluding the 91st Street station, had their platforms extended in the 1950s to accommodate ten-car trains as part of a $100 million rebuilding program (equivalent to $ million in ). The joint venture of Rosoff Bros Inc. and Joseph Meltzer Associates Inc. received a contract to remodel the 50th Street, 59th Street, and 66th Street stations in February 1957. The platform extensions at the local stations were completed by early 1958. Once the project was completed, all 1 trains became local and all 2 and 3 trains became express, and eight-car local trains began operation. Increased and lengthened service was implemented during peak hours on the 1 train on February 6, 1959. Due to the lengthening of the platforms at 86th Street and 96th Street, the intermediate 91st Street station was closed on February 2, 1959, because it was too close to the other two stations.

On November 29, 1962, a new entrance at the station opened, leading to the lobby of the Philharmonic (now David Geffen) Hall of Lincoln Center. The entrance led from the downtown platform of the station, but also provided access to the uptown platform by an underpass at the station's south end. This entrance was built as part of a $10.2 million underground complex by the New York City Parks Department for the Philharmonic Hall. The project was partially funded by a Federal grant, and the work was contracted out to Slattery Construction Company.

1980s to present
In 1981, the MTA announced the creation of its Culture Stations program to install public art in the subway. The Culture Stations program was started to deter graffiti, and was inspired by legislation in the New York City Council that mandated that 1% of the cost of constructing public buildings be used for art. The program was modeled on the Louvre – Rivoli station on the Paris Métro, which featured reproductions of the artwork on display in the Louvre. Four stations, namely 66th Street, Astor Place, Eastern Parkway–Brooklyn Museum, and Fifth Avenue/53rd Street, were selected for the program due to their proximity to cultural institutions. These would be among the first stations in the MTA's new station refurbishment program, which began in 1982. Initially, there was funding only for the Astor Place and Fifth Avenue/53rd Street stations. The MTA announced in 1983 that it would allocate funding to renovate the 66th Street station as part of its capital program.

The renovation was supposed to have been partially funded by developer Daniel Brodsky, who had contributed $1.06 million toward the project in exchange for more floor space at 45 West 67th Street, an apartment building that Brodsky was constructing nearby. Several developers would have contributed additional funds for the project. However, the funds remained unused for several years. The Eastern Parkway and 66th Street stations had still not been renovated by 1986, even though the Astor Place and Fifth Avenue/53rd Street projects had been completed by then. According to New York City Planning Commission chairwoman Sylvia Deutsch, the MTA had chosen to delay the 66th Street project.

In April 1988, the New York City Transit Authority (NYCTA) unveiled plans to speed up service on the Broadway–Seventh Avenue Line through the implementation of a skip-stop service: the 9 train. When skip-stop service started in 1989, it was only implemented north of 137th Street–City College on weekdays, and 66th Street was served by both the 1 and the 9. Skip-stop service ended on May 27, 2005, as a result of a decrease in the number of riders who benefited.

In 1996, the MTA announced that it would renovate the 66th Street station over the next three years starting that September. The station was rebuilt to designs by Lee Harris Pomeroy. As part of the $16 million project, the station would get new floor and wall tiles, new lighting, a new staircase, and would have two elevators installed to make the station compliant with the Americans with Disabilities Act of 1990. In addition, communication and power systems were upgraded, and control areas were redesigned. The station's original terra cotta mosaics were restored as part of the project. As part of the Arts for Transit program, mosaics by Nancy Spero were installed on the platforms. At the time of the renovation, the station had seen a 12 percent increase in ridership over the past few years because of the presence of new apartment buildings and popular businesses nearby.

Station layout

Like other local stations, 66th Street has four tracks and two side platforms. The two express tracks are used by the 2 train during daytime hours and the 3 train at all times. The 66th Street station is fully wheelchair-accessible, with elevators connecting the street and platforms. There is also a crossunder between the uptown and downtown side platforms at the extreme south end of the station, which is not wheelchair-accessible.

Design

As with other stations built as part of the original IRT, the station was constructed using a cut-and-cover method. The tunnel is covered by a "U"-shaped trough that contains utility pipes and wires. Each platform consists of  concrete slabs, beneath which are drainage basins. The original platforms contain circular, cast-iron Doric-style columns spaced every , while the platform extensions contain I-beam columns. Additional columns between the tracks, spaced every , support the jack-arched concrete station roofs. There is a  gap between the trough wall and the platform walls, which are made of -thick brick covered over by a tiled finish.

The decorative scheme consists of yellow faience station-name tablets, buff tile bands, a yellow faience cornice, and blue faience plaques. The mosaic tiles at all original IRT stations were manufactured by the American Encaustic Tile Company, which subcontracted the installations at each station. The decorative work was performed by tile contractor Manhattan Glass Tile Company and faience contractor Grueby Faience Company. The ceilings of the original platforms and fare control areas contain plaster molding. The walls at the platform level were renovated in 2004 and are decorated with mosaics designed by New York artist Nancy Spero.

Exits
There are two staircases and one elevator on the southeastern corner of Broadway and 66th Street, leading to the northbound platform. Two staircases and one elevator on the southwestern corner of the same intersection lead to the southbound platform. Both sets of entrances and exits lead directly to their respective platform levels. A third set of exits, at the extreme south end of the southbound platform, contains a stair to the southwestern corner of Columbus Avenue and 65th Street, as well as a passageway to David Geffen Hall. This section of the station contains the crossunder.

Nearby points of interest

The station provides access to Lincoln Center for the Performing Arts just to the south, with Alice Tully Hall just to the west. All of the Lincoln Center venues are connected by underground concourses near the southern end of the station. Dante Park, upstairs at the south end, is named for the poet Dante Alighieri, whose statue is found there. Richard Tucker Park is nearby, at the north end of Lincoln Square.

A number of schools are nearby as well, including the Fiorello H. LaGuardia High School of Music & Art and Performing Arts and some small schools located in the former Martin Luther King Jr. High School building.

This station also provides access to:

ABC Television Center East studios, and its affiliate WABC-TV
American Folk Art Museum
Amsterdam Houses, New York City Housing Authority
The Beacon School
Leonard Bernstein Way (W. 65th Street between Amsterdam Avenue and Broadway)
Central Park
Church of St. Paul the Apostle
Church of the Good Shepherd
Ethical Culture Fieldston School, Lower School
Fordham University Lincoln Center campus
Holy Trinity Church
Peter Jennings Way (W. 66th Street between Columbus Avenue and Central Park West)
Juilliard School
Lincoln Center for the Performing Arts
Lincoln Square farmers market (at Richard Tucker Square)
Lincoln Square Synagogue
Manhattan New York Temple (Mormon)
Merkin Concert Hall
Museum of Biblical Art (American Bible Society)
New York Institute of Technology
 New York Society for Ethical Culture
West Side YMCA

References

External links 

 
 nycsubway.org – Artemis, Acrobats, Divas and Dancers Artwork by Nancy Spero (2004)
 Station Reporter – 1 Train
 Forgotten NY – Original 28 – NYC's First 28 Subway Stations
 MTA's Arts For Transit–66th Street–Lincoln Center (IRT Broadway–Seventh Avenue Line)
 66th Street entrance from Google Maps Street View
 65th Street entrance from Google Maps Street View
 Platforms from Google Maps Street View

IRT Broadway–Seventh Avenue Line stations
Upper West Side
Broadway (Manhattan)
New York City Subway stations in Manhattan
Railway stations in the United States opened in 1904
Lincoln Square, Manhattan
1904 establishments in New York City